Raymond McCormick (30 January 1931 – 8 June 2013) was an Australian cricketer. He played six first-class matches for South Australia in 1959/60.

References

External links
 

1931 births
2013 deaths
Australian cricketers
South Australia cricketers
Cricketers from Adelaide